The Hong Kong Hockey Association is the sports governing body of field hockey in Hong Kong. It is affiliated with two hockey federations, the IHF International Hockey Federation and AHF Asian Hockey Federation. The headquarters of the federation are in Hong Kong.

Sarinder Dillon is the President of the Hong Kong Hockey Association and Ernest Li is the Secretary General.

See also
 Hong Kong men's national field hockey team
 Hong Kong women's national field hockey team

References

External links
 Hong Kong Hockey Association

Hong Kong
Hockey
Field hockey in Hong Kong